Shih Hsin Tao  (born October 11, 1948) is a Buddhist monk of the Linji School (Chan Buddhism) based in Taiwan and the founder of the Ling Jiou Mountain Buddhist Society (LJM). He also founded the Museum of World Religions (MWR) and the NGO initiative ‘Global Family for Love & Peace’ (GFLP).

Biography

Early years 
Born in 1948 in Laikan Village, Laidaoshan Region, Lashio, Myanmar, to parents of Chinese origin from the Province of Yunnan . The given name was YANG Xiao-Sheng (Chinese: 楊小生).

His father YANG Xiao-Cai was killed in 1952 and his mother LI Shu-Jen went missing with his  younger sister YANG Xiao-Ping and were never to hear from again. War-orphaned at the age  of 4, YANG Xiao-Sheng was first raised by his aunt YANG Xiao-Si who passed away shortly  thereafter and his uncle-in-law YIN Hu-Nan took him along into the mountains as a hobo until  1957, when Uncle Yin’s buddy army officer LU Ding-Zhou encouraged the 9-year old boy to  join the guerilla army to have access to learning things. His given name was changed to  YANG Jian-Sheng but mis-spelled as YANG Jin-Sheng (Chinese: 楊進生) for formalities. 

YANG was with the Solitary Army which retreated to Taiwan in 1961 and was enrolled in the Company of Youngster Soldiers stationed in the Chengkungling Army Training Center. He was admitted to the Hsin-Hsing Elementary School of Tan-zi Township in Taichung in early 1963 but later started schooling at the Yuan-Shu-Lin Elementary School in Da-si Township, Taoyuan, when the army base was moved to Taoyuan.

Spiritual Journey 
YANG couldn’t stop his tears upon first hearing the holy name of Bodhisattva Guanyin in 1963. Yang began to chant the Great Compassion Mantra, reciting the Universal Gate Chapter of the Lotus Sutra and reading Buddha's life stories. He took refuge in Bodhisattva Guanyin.

Into Buddhism 
He was ordained as a novice monk in 1973 at the age of 25 under Venerable Master Hsing Yun at Fo Guang Shan, and entered Tsung Lin Buddhist College at the same time. The next year, he went to a mountainous area of Taipei city,  Waishuanghsi (Chinese: 外雙溪) , and meditated there for over eighteen hours a day. The following year (1975), Hsin Tao sought out an even more remote location, in Yilan County, to continue his practice. At the age of 31 (1979), he moved to Longtan, Yilan, where he continued to meditate, for twenty hours each day. Three years later (1982, age 34), he began a six-month retreat, including long fasts, with neither food or water. In 1983, he moved to a mountain overlooking the eastern coast of Taiwan in Fulong. His daily diet was nine "hundred flower pills"  (Chinese: 百花丸, a type of Chinese medicine) and spring water.

Founding his temple 
He later founded the Ling Jiou Mountain Monastery in 1983.  Through the Ling Jiou Mountain Buddhist Foundation, he founded the Museum of World Religions (Chinese: 世界宗教博物館) in the Yonghe District of New Taipei City, Taiwan, in 2001. He founded the Global Family for Love and Peace in New York, United States, in 2002.
He is also interested in interfaith dialogue and currently sits on the Board of World Religious Leaders for the Elijah Interfaith Institute.

See also 
 Buddhism in Taiwan
 Elijah Interfaith Institute

References

External links
 Hsin Tao: Chronology of Events

1948 births
Living people
Burmese people of Chinese descent
Taiwanese Buddhist monks
Museum founders
Religion in Taiwan